Éric Rochat (October 18, 1936 in Paris – October 5, 2003 in Rio de Janeiro) was a French film producer, director and scriptwriter. He is mostly known for his success in producing erotic films.

Biography 
He started his cinematographic career as a producer with François Reichenbach portraying musicians such as Arthur Rubinstein in 1969, and Yehudi Menuhin in 1971.

In 1972, Rochat partnered with Claude Giroux to produce his first feature film, The Killer, starring Jean Gabin as the chief of police Le Guen. The movie casting also gave Gerard Depardieu his first movie role. In 1973 they produced The Dominici Affair starring Jean Gabin as Gaston Dominici.

In 1975, after buying the rights of Story of O, a book written by Pauline Reage, from his partner Claude Giroux, Rochat produced the erotic cult film Story of O, directed by Just Jaeckin and starring Corinne Clery.

In 1976, Rochat produced Sex O'Clock USA, a French non-fiction feature documentary directed by François Reichenbach. The feature film reviews the hidden sexuality of a highly puritanical US society.

Then in 1980, Rochat produced Tusk, directed by surrealist Alejandro Jodorowsky, and based on the novel Poo Lorn of the Elephants, by Reginald Campbell.

In 1981, the story of the icon of the times, Coco Chanel, was brought to the screen in Chanel Solitaire, directed by George Kaczender, starring Marie-France Pisier, Lambert Wilson and Timothy Dalton.

In 1984,  Rochat wrote, produced, and directed the Story of O sequel, Story of O - Chapter 2, starring Sandra Wey.

In 1987, Rochat wrote and directed in Japan the feature film Too Much, produced by Menahem Golan and Yoram Globus. This futuristic feature film for kids uses Japanese technology to tell a story between a little girl and a robot.

In 1990, Rochat produced The 5th Monkey. This feature film, starring Ben Kingsley, is an adaptation from the eponymous novel by Jacques Zibi, who co-wrote the script with Rochat.

In 1992, the ten-hour series Story of O - The Series was written, produced and directed by Rochat. Its DVD box received great commercial success.

In 2002, Rochat wrote, produced and co-directed Living O with his spouse Chrystianne Rochat. This TV feature film tells the story of a movie producer who desires to live the experiences of Os Sir Stephen.  The film was shot in Rio de Janeiro.

Filmography

As a producer 

 1972: The Killer
 1973: The Dominici Affair
 1975: Story of O
 1976: Sex O'Clock USA
 1980: Tusk
 1983: Chanel Solitaire
 1984: Story of O - Chapter 2
 1987: Too Much
 1990: The 5th Monkey
 2002: Living O

As a director 
 1984: Story of O - Chapter 2
 1987: Too Much
 1990: The 5th Monkey
 1992: Story of O - The Séries
 2002: Living O

As a scriptwriter 
 1984: Story of O - Chapter 2
 1987: Too Much
 1990: The 5th Monkey
 1992: Story of O - The Séries
 2002: Living O

References 

 "American Film Institute" - "Catalog of Feature Films"
 "British Film Institute" - "Film Forever"
 "The Swedish Film Institute"-  "The Swedish Film Database"
 "The Wayne State University Libraries" - "WSU Library Catalog"
 "Park Circus" - "Park Circus Collections"
 "IMDb most rated title"
 Histoire d'O, with Guido Crepax 
 Histoire d'O N°2, with Guido Crepax
 "Characterization of Thin Film Mechanical Properties"
 Histoire d'O N°2 film music in Hans Zimmer composer biography
 "Histoire d'O" on Filmscoop

External links 
 
 Éric Rochat on Allociné
 Filmography Allociné
 Éric Rochat on Unifrance

1936 births
2003 deaths
French film producers
French film directors
20th-century French screenwriters